The 2017 African Handball Super Cup (23rd edition), also known as Babacar Fall Super Cup, in honour of the first chairman of the African Handball Confederation, was a handball competition organized by the African Handball Confederation, under the auspices of the International Handball Federation, the handball sport governing body. The matches, held on 12 April 2017 in Agadir, Morocco, were contested by Al Ahly SC, the 2016 African Handball Champions League winner and Zamalek, the 2016 African Handball Cup Winners' Cup winner, on the man's side and Clube Desportivo Primeiro de Agosto, the 2016 African Women's Handball Champions League winner and CARA Brazzaville in absence of TKC of Cameroon. Al Ahly SC, on the man's side and Primeiro de Agosto, on the woman's side, were the winners.

Al Ahly SC and Primeiro de Agosto qualified for the 2017 IHF Super Globe.

2017 Africa Men's Handball Super Cup

2017 Africa Women's Handball Super Cup

Awards

See also
 2016 African Handball Champions League
 2016 African Women's Handball Champions League
 2016 African Handball Cup Winners' Cup
 2016 African Women's Handball Cup Winners' Cup

References

External links
 Official website

Africa Handball Super Cup
Africa Handball Super Cup
African Handball Super Cup
International handball competitions hosted by Morocco
African Handball Super Cup
April 2017 sports events in Africa